Maiao, also known as Mai'ao or Maiao in languages other than Tahitian, is an  island formation located  southwest of Moorea and one of the Windward Islands (French: Îles du Vent) in French Polynesia.

Geography
The island formation consists of one high island with a peak elevation of 154 meters (505') and a low island (or motu) that winds along the base of the high island. The formation encloses two hypersaline lagoons called Roto Iti and Roto Rahi. The island also has a lagoon at its edge. All lagoons are connected through narrow channels.  The island is home to 299 people (as of Aug. 2007 census).

Administration
The island is administratively part of the commune (municipality) of Moorea-Maiao, itself in the administrative subdivision of the Windward Islands.

References

 at Oceandots.com (accessed June 22, 2006)
Lesser known Society Islands at colonialvoyage.com (accessed Oct. 22, 2006)] (includes image)

Islands of the Society Islands